G. laevis  may refer to:
 Gogangra laevis, a fish species
 Gyraulus laevis, a freshwater snail species

See also
 List of Latin and Greek words commonly used in systematic names#L